Northeast Africa, or Northeastern Africa or Northern East Africa as it was known in the past, is a geographic regional term used to refer to the countries of Africa situated in and around the Red Sea. The region is intermediate between North Africa and East Africa, and mainly encompasses the Horn of Africa (Ethiopia, Eritrea, Somalia, Djibouti, Sudan) and as well as Egypt. The region has a very long history of habitation with fossil finds from the early hominids to modern human and is one of the most genetically and linguistically diverse regions of the world, being the home to many civilizations and located on an important trade route that connects multiple continents.

See also
 East Africa
 Horn of Africa
 North Africa
 Southeast Africa
 Arabian Peninsula
 Iran
 Levant
 Iraq
 Ancient Egypt
 Kush kingdom
 The land of Punt

References

Regions of Africa